Inari-machi is a Hiroden station (tram stop) on Hiroden Main Line, located in Inari-machi, Minami-ku, Hiroshima.

Routes
From Inari-machi Station, there are three of Hiroden Streetcar routes.

 Hiroshima Station - Hiroshima Port Route
 Hiroshima Station - Hiroden-miyajima-guchi Route
 Hiroshima Station - Eba Route

Connections
█ Main Line
  
Matoba-cho — Inari-machi — Kanayama-cho

Around station
 Inari Shrine
 Hiroshima Fashion Business Speciality College

History
Opened on November 23, 1912.
Moved to the current place in 1950.

See also
 Hiroden Streetcar Lines and Routes

References

Inari-machi Station
Railway stations in Japan opened in 1912